Anacanthotermes viarum is a species of harvester termite in the family Hodotermitidae. It is found in India and Sri Lanka. It is a grass feeder.

References

Termites
Insects described in 1779
Insects of India